Lethal Angels, also known as Naked Avengers, is a 2006 action film starring Tien Hsin, Cherrie Yin, Fei Lei, Hua Wei, Andy On and Jordan Chan. The film is directed by Cheng Wai-man.

Cast
Tien Hsin
Cherrie Ying
Jordan Chan
Andy On
Hua Wei
Fei Lei

See also
 Naked Weapon

External links
 

2006 films
Hong Kong action thriller films
2006 action thriller films
2000s Cantonese-language films
Hong Kong martial arts films
2000s English-language films
2000s Hong Kong films